The Switzerland  men's national under-21 volleyball team represents Switzerland in international men's volleyball competitions and friendly matches under the age 21 and it is ruled by the Swiss Volleyball Federation body that is an affiliate of the Federation of International Volleyball FIVB and also part of the European Volleyball Confederation CEV.

Results

FIVB U21 World Championship
 Champions   Runners up   Third place   Fourth place

Team

Previous squad

References

External links
www.volleyball.ch/

National men's under-21 volleyball teams
Volleyball
Volleyball in Switzerland